Chalcidichthys malacapterygius is an extinct prehistoric manefish that lived during the Upper Miocene of Southern California. It is assumed to have preyed on siphonophores, like its living relatives.

See also

 Prehistoric fish
 List of prehistoric bony fish

References

Miocene fish of North America
Caristiidae
Prehistoric perciform genera